New Zealand participated in the 2010 Summer Youth Olympics in Singapore.

The New Zealand squad consisted of 54 athletes competing in 16 sports: aquatics (swimming), athletics, badminton, basketball, boxing, cycling, equestrian, field hockey, judo, rowing, sailing, shooting, table tennis, triathlon, weightlifting and wrestling.

Medalists

Athletics

Note: The athletes who do not have a "Q" next to their Qualification Rank advance to a non-medal ranking final.

Boys
Track and road events

Field events

Girls
Track and road events

Field events

Badminton

Boys

Girls

Basketball

Boys

Boxing

Boys

Cycling

Cross Country

Time Trial

BMX

Road Race

Overall

Equestrian-Showjumping

Field hockey

Judo

Individual

Team

Rowing

Sailing

One Person Dinghy

Shooting

Rifle

Swimming

Table tennis

Individual

Team

Triathlon

Girls

Men's

Mixed

Weightlifting

Wrestling

Freestyle

References

External links
Competitors List: New Zealand 

2010 in New Zealand sport
Nations at the 2010 Summer Youth Olympics
New Zealand at the Youth Olympics